Tennant is a city in Shelby County, Iowa, United States. The population was 78 at the time of the 2020 census.

History
Tennant had its start by the building of the Chicago & Great Western Railroad through that territory.

Geography
Tennant is located at  (41.594246, -95.441976).

Demographics

2010 census
As of the census of 2010, there were 68 people, 33 households, and 23 families residing in the city. The racial makeup of the city was 100.0% White.

There were 33 households, of which 15.2% had children under the age of 18 living with them, 66.7% were married couples living together, 3.0% had a male householder with no wife present, and 30.3% were non-families. 30.3% of all households were made up of individuals, and 18.2% had someone living alone who was 65 years of age or older. The average household size was 2.06 and the average family size was 2.52.

The median age in the city was 52.8 years. 16.2% of residents were under the age of 18; 4.4% were between the ages of 18 and 24; 13.2% were from 25 to 44; 36.9% were from 45 to 64; and 29.4% were 65 years of age or older. The gender makeup of the city was 54.4% male and 45.6% female.

2000 census
As of the census of 2000, there were 78 people, 34 households, and 24 families residing in the city. The racial makeup of the city was 100.00% White.

There were 32 households, out of which 15.6% had children under the age of 18 living with them, 68.8% were married couples living together, 3.1% had a female householder with no husband present, and 25.0% were non-families. 21.9% of all households were made up of individuals, and 6.3% had someone living alone who was 65 years of age or older. The average household size was 2.28 and the average family size was 2.67.

Age spread:  13.7% under the age of 18, 4.1% from 18 to 24, 26.0% from 25 to 44, 26.0% from 45 to 64, and 30.1% who were 65 years of age or older. The median age was 48 years. For every 100 females, there are 87.2 males. For every 100 females age 18 and over, there were 96.9 males.

The median income for a household in the city was $32,321, and the median income for a family was $40,417. Males had a median income of $30,938, females $21,250.. The per capita income for the city was $18,982. 1.7% of the population is below the poverty line, but no families are below the poverty line. Out of the total population, none are under the age of 18 or of those 65 and older were living below the poverty line.

Government
The town's government is based on the mayor-council system. Roy Williamson is the mayor, while Shelly Tearney is the City Clerk. Council meetings are held on the second Tuesday of each month.

Education
Most of the municipal limits is served by the AHSTW Community School District. It was previously in the A-H-S-T Community School District. On July 1, 2016, that district merged into AHSTW.

References

Cities in Shelby County, Iowa
Cities in Iowa